Diego Felipe Bertie Brignardello (2 November 1967 – 5 August 2022) was a Peruvian actor and singer. His performances spanned in film, theatre and television. He studied at Markham College in Lima, Peru and was also a singer in the mid eighties and had a pop group called Imágenes.

Telenovelas
  Rosa de América (1988) as Ignacio
 El Hombre que Debe Morir as Baby
 Natacha (1990) as Pedro
 Fandango (1992) as Bruno Strombombi
 Escuela de la Calle: Pirañitas (1994) as Sergio
 Canela (1994) as Adrián Helguera
 Obsesión (1996) as Leonardo Ratto
 Pisco Sour (1996)
 La Noche  (1997) as Joaquín Falcón
 Leonela, Muriendo de Amor (1997) as Pedro Luis Guerra Morales
  (1998) as Gonzalo "Chalo" García León
 Amantes de Luna LLena (2000) as Simón Luna
 Cazando a un Millonario (2001) as Felipe Castillo
 Vale Todo (2002) as Ivan
 Eva del Edén (2004) as Roldán de Astorga y Carrasco
 Decisiones (2005) Various roles
 La Ex (2006) as Sergio Estevéz
 Yuru, La Princesa Amazónica (2007) as Leo
 Tiempo Final (2007) as Miguel
 Amas de Casa Desesperadas (2008) as Tom Scavo
 Bermúdez (2009) as Gonzalo Lleras
  (2010) as Martin Gomes
 Al Fondo Hay Sitio (2015) as Sergio Estrada
 El Cazafortunas (2015)
 El Regreso de Lucas (2016) - Honorio Cárdenas
 De vuelta al barrio (2017) as Luis Felipe Sandoval

Theatre
 Annie (1987) opposite Oswaldo Cattone
 Fantástikos
 Simón as Simón Bolívar
 Yepeto as Antonio
 Un Don Juan en el Infierno as Don Juan's son
 Contragolpe
 Eclipse Total as Arthur Rimbaud
 Locos de Amor as Eddie
 Blood Wedding as Leonardo
 Life Is a Dream as Segismundo
 Las Tres Hermanas as Vershinin
 Edipo Rey as Edipo
 El Rey Lear as Edgar
 Fausto (2001)
 La Opera de los Tres Centavos (2003)
 Te Amo María (2004)
 El Jardín Secreto (2007)
 Una Comedia Romana (2008)
 La Jaula de Las Locas (2010)

Films
 Ultra Warrior (1990) as Phil
 Full Fathom Five (1990) as Miguel
 Report on Death (1993)
 Todos Somos Estrellas (1993)
 Muerto De Amor (2002) as Mario
 El Bien Esquivo (2001) as Jerónimo de Ávila
 Bajo La Piel (1996) as Gino Leyva
 Without Compassion (1994) as Ramón Romano
 El Atraco (2004) as Bernal
 Muerto por Muriel (2004) as Bernie
 Crossing a Shadow (2005) as Enrique Aet
 Los Andes no Creen en Dios (2005) as Adolfo
 Pirates in Callao (2005; voice)
 Desierto Infernal
 Batallas En Silencio
 Esto Huele Mal
 Qué Difícil es Amar (2018)

Bands
 Imágenes
 Diego Bertie

References

External links

 

1967 births
2022 deaths
Peruvian people of British descent
Peruvian people of Italian descent
Peruvian male film actors
Peruvian male stage actors
Peruvian male telenovela actors
People from Lima
20th-century Peruvian male actors
21st-century Peruvian male actors
Male actors from Lima